Khezerlu Rural District is in the Central District of Ajab Shir County, East Azerbaijan province, Iran. At the census of 2006, its population was 8,435 in 2,033 households; there were 7,830 inhabitants in 2,347 households at the following census of 2011; and in the most recent census of 2016, the population of the rural district was 7,491 in 2,395 households. The largest of its seven villages was Khezerlu, with 3,505 people.

References 

Ajab Shir County

Rural Districts of East Azerbaijan Province

Populated places in East Azerbaijan Province

Populated places in Ajab Shir County